Kudangsky is a rural locality (a settlement) in Permasskoye Rural Settlement, Nikolsky District, Vologda Oblast, Russia. The population was 276 as of 2010.

Geography 
Kudangsky is located 46 km south of Nikolsk (the district's administrative centre) by road. Gorokhovsky is the nearest rural locality.

References 

Rural localities in Nikolsky District, Vologda Oblast